Barbara Owen may refer to:
 Barbara Owen (organist)
 Barbara Owen (EastEnders)

See also
 Barbara Owens, American novelist